Dot Peak is a small eminence,  high, marking the highest point of Cooper Nunatak, at the east side of the Brown Hills. It was mapped by the Victoria University of Wellington Antarctic Expedition in 1962–63 and so named because of its small size.

References 

Mountains of Oates Land